SS Empire Aden was a 7,308 ton steamship which was built in 1945 for the Ministry of War Transport (MoWT), she was sold in 1948 becoming Etivebank, and sold in 1956 and renamed Alcyone Fortune. In 1958 she was sold to Panama and renamed Northern Venture serving until running aground off Okinawa in 1967.

History
Empire Addison was built by Bartram & Sons Ltd, Sunderland and launched on 12 February 1945, being completed on 14 May. Initially she was managed by H Hogarth & Sons, but management passed to A Weir & Co in 1946. In 1948, she was sold to A Weir & Sons, and renamed Etivebank, managed by A Vergottis. On 15 December 1950, Etivebank ran aground at Licata, Italy after an anchor chain broke in heavy weather.  and  went to her aid. On 23 February 1951, Etivebank was damaged in an incident involving the SS Texas in the Suez Canal. The owners of Texas were unsuccessfully sued for damages, a decision which was upheld on appeal.

In 1956, she was sold to Alcyone Shipping Co, London and renamed Alcyone Fortune, serving for two years before being sold to the Pan Norse Steamship Co, Panama when she was reflagged and renamed Northern Venture.

Northern Venture was managed by Wallem & Co, Hong Kong until 1966, when management passed to Wak Kwong & Co. On 9 June 1967, Northern Venture ran aground off Okinawa en route from Tsumuki to Manila. She broke in two and was declared a total loss. Northern Venture was sold for scrapping locally.

Official number and code letters
Official Numbers were a forerunner to IMO Numbers.

Empire Aden had the UK Official Number 180156 and used the Code Letters GDMK.

References

1945 ships
Ships built on the River Wear
Steamships of the United Kingdom
Empire ships
Ministry of War Transport ships
Maritime incidents in 1950
Steamships of Panama
Merchant ships of Panama
Maritime incidents in 1951
Maritime incidents in 1967